Zameer Ikraam Sattaur is an Islamic scholar who was the former Imam of Masjid Al-Abdin in Queens, New York and a Muslim chaplain with The Metropolitan Transportation Authority in New York City.

Biography
Imam Zameer Sattaur was born in Georgetown, Guyana in 1966. From a young age, he began preliminary Islamic studies with local Imams and leaders of his hometown. He was selected to represent his country in the World Quran Competition in 1982 at the age of 17. During this competition he entered the Kaabah and was given a Kiswa by the Governor of Makkah al Mukarramah. During this trip he visited the city of the Islamic prophet Muhammad. Several months after his return he was selected to attend the Islamic University of Madinah. In addition to his University studies, there, he studied with Shaykh Muhammad Alawi al-Maliki al-Hasani and others.

Zameer returned year after year for not only the performance of Hajj.  he had led and assisted nearly 15,000 pilgrims from the United States, Canada, the United Kingdom, the Caribbean and Guyana.

Zameer served as the Imam of Masjid Al Abidin in Queens, New York from 1993 to 2007. Imam Zameer has served as an advisor & Khatib of several Masajid and Islamic Centers in the New York tri-state area, in addition to presently serving as the Muslim Chaplain of the MTA New York City.

Imam Zameer is currently involved with several special projects with various organizations.

Masjid Al Abidin
During Imam Zameer Sattaur's time at Masjid Al-Abidin, the mosque expanded to include the adjacent lot, the house next door, which became the home to sisters of the congregation, and the church across the street from the main premise. In 2016 he returned in a special advisory capacity to Masjid Al-Abidin in order to assist in their redevelopment and construction. This project, though forthcoming, is intended to reach thousands of Muslims in the New York City region. The fledgling community has outgrown the capacity of the present facility, as there is constant overflow of worshippers onto the parking lot and nearby streets. On any given Eid Salaah, worshipers number in the thousands, which ultimately poses severe challenges, to cater for every worshipper in terms of providing adequate, safe, comfortable and compliant space for offering of prayers. Consequently, the new project forced by need, to embark on the next chapter of Masjid Al-Abidin. This is centered around expanding the current 30-year old facility, into a modern, state of the art multi-functional Islamic Mosque and Community Center.

References

External links
Imam Zameer's Official Website

1963 births
Living people
Guyanese Sunni Muslims
King Saud University alumni
Guyanese emigrants to the United States
American imams
Religious leaders from New York City